Brimstone Angels is a fantasy novel by Erin M. Evans based on the Dungeons & Dragons role-playing game, set largely in the city of Neverwinter within the world of the Forgotten Realms.

Plot summary
The tiefling sisters Farideh and Havilar were abandoned by their mother at birth and have been raised by their adoptive father Mehen in an isolated village. Farideh makes a pact with the devil Lorcan that gives her special powers. Mehen and the two sisters subsequently move to the city of Neverwinter to work as bounty hunters. There they find themselves pawns in a far-reaching supernatural plot.

Publication history
Brimstone Angels, written by Erin M. Evans, with cover art by Kekai Kotaki, was published by Wizards of the Coast in November 2011 as a 339-page paperback. It is the first novel in the six-part "Brimstone Angels Saga" series:
 Brimstone Angels
 Lesser Evils (2012)
 The Adversary (2013)
 Fire in the Blood (2014)
 Ashes of the Tyrant (2015)
 The Devil You Know (2016)

Reception
Brimstone Angels was #9 on CBR's 2020 "10 Of The Best DnD Stories To Start Off With" list — the article states that "What makes The Brimstone Angels a great novel for those starting with D & D is that it provides a great amount of insight into the Tieflings' mindset and society. The novel's narrative also provides insight into how a party member's background can provide a great seed for interesting adventures."

References

2011 American novels
Forgotten Realms novels